Türkmenbaşy şäherçesi is a town and the administrative center of Türkmenbaşy District, Balkan Province, Turkmenistan.  It is east of the city of Türkmenbaşy, Turkmenistan, with which it should not be confused.  Türkmenbaşy şäherçesi was previously called Janga.

Etymology
Atanyyazow notes that Janga is a Kazakh variant of the name of a local well called Ýanyja. The name was changed in 1993 to honor then-President Saparmyrat Niyazov.

History
Known then as Janga, the settlement was granted status of a "town of urban type" in 1940, and was renamed Town of Turkmenbashy in 1993. The town is primarily noted as the site of Janga Naval Base, the home port of the Turkmen Navy.

Transportation
The M37 highway passes through the town.  It is served by the Gyuşa rail station on the Türkmenbaşy-Ashgabat rail line. It is approximately 20 kilometers from the Turkmenbashi International Airport.

References

Populated places in Balkan Region